Managerial economics is a branch of economics involving the application of economic methods in the organizational decision-making process. Economics is the study of the production, distribution, and consumption of goods and services. Managerial economics involves the use of economic theories and principles to make decisions regarding the allocation of scarce resources.

Managers use economic frameworks in order to optimize profits, resource allocation and the overall output of the firm, whilst improving efficiency and minimising unproductive activities. These frameworks assist organisations to make rational, progressive decisions, by analysing practical problems at both micro and macroeconomic levels. Managerial decisions involve forecasting (making decisions about the future), which involve levels of risk and uncertainty, however, the assistance of managerial economic techniques aid in informing managers in these decisions.

The two main purposes of managerial economics are:
 To optimize decision making when the firm is faced with problems or obstacles, with the consideration and application of macro and microeconomic theories and principles.
 To analyze the possible effects and implications of both short and long-term planning decisions on the revenue and profitability of the Business.

The core principles that managerial economist use to achieve the above purposes are:
 monitoring operations management and performance,
 target or goal setting, and
 talent management and development.

In order to optimize economic decisions, the use of operations research, mathematical programming, strategic decision making, game theory and other computational methods are often involved. The methods listed above are typically used for making quantitate decisions by data analysis techniques.

The theory of Managerial Economics includes a focus on; incentives, business organization, biases, advertising, innovation, uncertainty, pricing, analytics, and competition. In other words, managerial economics is a combination of economics and managerial theory. It helps the manager in decision-making and acts as a link between practice and theory.
Furthermore, managerial economics provides the device and techniques for managers to make the best possible decisions for any scenario.

Some examples of the types of problems that the tools provided by managerial economics can answer are:
 The price and quantity of a good or service that a business should produce.
 Whether to invest in training current staff or to look into the market.
 When to purchase or retire fleet equipment.
 Decisions regarding understanding the competition between two firms based on the motive of profit maximization.
 The impacts of consumer and competitor incentives plan on business decisions

Managerial economics is sometimes referred to as business economics and is a branch of economics that applies microeconomic analysis to decision methods of businesses or other management units to assist managers to make a wide array of multifaceted decisions. The calculation and quantitative analysis draws heavily from techniques such as regression analysis, correlation and calculus.

Economic Theories relevant to Managerial Economics

Microeconomics is the dominant focus behind managerial economics, some of the key aspects include:

 Supply and Demand

The law of supply and demand describes the relationship between producers and consumers of a product. The law suggests that price set by the producer and quantity demanded by a consumer are inversely proportional, meaning an increase in the price set is met by a reduction in demand by the consumer.
The law further describes that sellers will provide a large quantity of the good if it sells at a high price.

Excess demand exists when the quantity of a good demanded is greater than the quantity supplied. Where there is excess demand, sellers can benefit by increasing the price. The converse applies to excess supply.

 Production theory

Production theory describes the quantity of a good a business chooses to produce due to multiple factors. These factors include; raw material inputs, labor, machinery costs, capital, etc. The production theory states that a business will strive to employ the cheapest combination of inputs to produce the quantity demanded.

 Opportunity cost

The opportunity cost details the costs and benefits of each action the business is considering pursuing, and the cost of choosing one activity over another. The decision-maker is then in the position to choose the action with the highest payoff.

 Theory of Exchange or Price Theory

The principle uses the conjecture of supply and demand to set an accurate price for a good. The aim of the price theory is to allocate a price for a good such that the supply of a good is met with equal demand for the product. If a manager sets a price to high for the good, the consumer may think it is not worth the cost and decide not to purchase the good, hence creating an excess in supply. The opposite occurs when the price is set too low, this causes demand for a good to be larger than the supply.

 Theory of Capital and Investment Decisions

Capital is the most critical factor in an enterprise, this theory prevails in the rational allocation of funds and decisions of organizations to invest in profitable projects or enterprises in order to improve the efficiency of organizations.
The rational allocation of funds may include acquiring business, investing in equipment, whether investment will improve the business at all.

 Elasticity of demand

The elasticity of demand is a prominent concept in managerial economics. Alfred Marshall in his own words described elasticity of demand as ‘The elasticity of demand in a market is great or small according to as the amount demanded increases much or little for a given fall in price and diminish much or little for a given rise in price.

The microeconomic principles are useful principles for managers to make decisions, Managerial economics entails the use of all of these analysis tools to make informed business decisions.

Analytical Methods used in Managerial Economics

 Price Elasticity of Demand Analysis

The price elasticity of demand is a highly useful tool in managerial economics as it provides managers with the predicted change in demand associated with an increase in the price charged for its goods and services. The price elasticity principle also outlines the changes in demand for goods with changes in the income of a populous.

The price elasticity is important for managerial economics as it aids in the optimization of marginal revenue of firms.

 Marginal analysis

In economics, margin is the change in revenue and cost by producing one extra unit of output. Both the marginal cost and marginal revenue are extremely important in marginal economics as profit of a firm is maximized when the marginal cost is equal to the marginal revenue. Managers can make business decisions on the output level based on the analysis, in order to maximize profit of the firm.

 Mathematical model analysis

In the development of economics and management, more and more econometric analysis methods are applied. The use of differential calculus is a powerful tool in managerial economics.

By taking the derivative of a function the maximum and minimum values of the function are very easily determined by setting the derivative equal to zero, an example of this is finding a quantity of production that maximizes the profit of the firm. This concept is important for managers to understand in order to minimize costs or maximize profits.

The main applications of mathematical models:

 Demand forecasting. Before determining the scale of production of a certain product, enterprises need to forecast the development potential of the market. Relevant mathematical models can be created to represent the quantitative changes in the various factors affecting the development of the market, and then analyse the magnitude of the impact of these changes on demand.
 Production analysis. The input of production factors, the choice of the form of production organisation and the determination of the product structure can all be analysed and decided by creating mathematical models.
 Cost decision. Cost is a factor that directly affects profit, and is one of the most important concerns for enterprise development. When an enterprise changes the direction of production and operation or expands its scale, under its goal of maximising profit, what kind of cost level should be determined can be scientifically analysed by applying mathematical models.
 Market analysis. The market is a fundamental concept in economics and in practice manifests itself in many different forms. Mathematical models can be created to analyse the size, price and competitive strategies that a company may choose under market conditions of different nature.
 Risk analysis. Risk analysis is the prediction of future states. Mathematical models can be created to represent the magnitude of the various factors involved in an investment and the impact that changes in magnitude may have on the benefits.

Nature of managerial economics

Managerial economics to a certain degree is prescriptive in nature as it suggests a course of action to a managerial problem. Managerial economics aims to provide the tools and techniques to make informed decisions to maximize the profits and minimize the losses of a firm. Managerial economics has use in many different business applications, although the most common areas of its focus are in relation to the Risk, Pricing, Production and Capital decisions a manager makes.

The decision making steps, which are guided by the tools of managerial economics, include;

 Define the ProblemThe first step in making a business decision is to understand the problem in its entirety. Without correct analysis on the problem at hand, developing a solution is an almost impossible task.Not correctly defining the problem can sometimes be the root of the problem that is trying to be solved.
 Determine the ObjectiveThe second step is evaluating the objective of the decision, or what the decision is trying to achieve. This step is determining a possible solution to the problem defined in step 1. This step may provide multiple possible solutions to the problem previously defined.
 Discover the AlternativesAfter in depth analysis into what is required to solve the problem faced by a business, options for potential solutions can be collated.In most cases, more than one possible solution to the problem exists. For example, a business striving to gain more attraction on social media could improve the quality of their content, collaborate with other creators or a combination of the two.
 Forecast the ConsequencesThis step involves assessing the consequences of the problem solutions detailed in step 3. Possible consequences of a business decisions could include; productivity, health, environmental impacts and risk.Here, managerial economics is used to determine the risks and potential financial consequences of an action.
 Make a DecisionAfter the consequences and potential solutions to the problem at hand have been analyzed, a decision can be made. At this point, the potential decisions should be measurable values which have been quantified by managerial economics to maximise profits, minimise risk and adverse outcomes of the firm. The make a decision step includes a sensitivity analysis of the solution. A sensitivity analysis of the selected solution provides detail of how the output of the solution changes with changes to the inputs. The sensitivity analysis allows the strengths and weaknesses of the designed solution to be analyzed.

Pricing 
It is important to understand what pricing decisions should be made regarding the products and services of the firm, as efficient pricing is required to maintain desired levels of revenue and profit, whilst also maintaining customer satisfaction. Setting a price too low reduces profitability, negatively affects the perceived quality of the product, and sets an expectation of price for the consumer. Setting a price too high may negatively affect the image of an organisation from the perspective of the consumer.

Managers may price using intuitive or technocratic decision-making styles. A technocratic approach relies on quantitative analysis and optimisation, and typically involves a compensatory method of evaluation. Compensatory evaluation allows one attribute to compensate for another attribute. For example, a manager may price a product at a lower price to compensate for its lower quality. Intuitive decision-making relies on consumer heuristics, defined as cognitive processes of fast decision-making, which occur by limiting the amount of information analysed.

Economic concepts such as competitive advantage, market segmentation, and price discrimination are relevant to pricing strategy. In order to set a price that drives sales and firm performance, managers must understand the economic environment in which they are operating.

Price Discrimination 

Price discrimination involves selling the same good at different prices to different consumer segments. Consumer segments are separated by a significant variation in the amount they are willing to pay. In order for price discrimination to occur, organisations must be able to separate customer segments so that consumers are not aware of price differences.

Consumer decision making (Biases and Theories) 

In order to successfully make organisational decisions, management must have an understanding of consumer behaviour and decision-making. Consumer behaviour relates to buying, using and selling goods, services, time and ideas by decision-making units.

Rational Choice Theory 

Rational Choice Theory is a decision-making theory, also known as the law-and-economics theory, which applies the assumption that people will try and maximise their outcomes, have well-defined preferences and are consistently rational decision-makers. This theory develops on the Economic Man Theory, which assumed that people respond to stimuli (external factors) to generate a response (outcome). Rational Choice Theory builds on this theory by understanding that the consumer is an information processing decision-maker, however it fails to incorporate psychological literature and empirical findings on the psychology of human-behaviour.

Rational Choice Theory makes the following assumptions:

 Objective criteria exist to enable a consumer to determine rational choices from irrational choices.
 Organisations and Consumers have negligible behavioural differences.
 Consumers make decisions based on conscious consideration of factors.
 Consumers make decisions using rational considerations.
 Consumers decide from a stable set of preferences.
 Consumers aim to maximise their circumstances.
 In maximising their circumstances, consumers perform a risk assessment.
 Satisfaction is easily assessable.

These assumptions do not account for circumstances of human error where consumers misinterpret information, or only consider portions of relevant information. The assumption of rational choice theory that when provided with all the required information, consumers will make a rational decision is limited.

State-Dependent Preferences 

Consumer preferences depend on the state the consumer is in when making the decision. Simple examples of states influencing decision making are food tasting better when you are hungry or going being more enjoyable when not sick. Most models of state-dependant preferences make the assumption that people are aware of the influence of their particular state on the preferences they are making in that moment, however empirical studies suggest this is not always true.

Projection bias occurs when consumers predict that their future tastes will represent their current tastes.

Attribution bias occurs when consumers consider past experiences in deciding whether to repeat a previously performed consumption activity. This bias can lead to systematic errors in economic decisions.

Cognitive bias, or status quo bias, occurs when consumers would rather follow previous procedures, or buy previously used products, without evidence that this choice is better than alternatives. This bias opposes the basic law of human nature, that the most adaptable species is the one to survive, and is in opposition with positive views on change expressed in business literature. Cognitive bias can cause interference with the effectiveness of public policies and successful application of relevant policies and choices.

Incentives 

Monetary and non-monetary incentives are used by managers to motivate employees to achieve results aligned with firms' objectives. The outcome of incentives depends on the design and the implementation process of the incentives, their interaction with intrinsic and social motivations, and the behavioural effects of their removal.

In a field experiment analyzing the effects of performance-based monetary incentives, it was shown that productivity improved in line with employees' ability, however there was an increase in neglect of non-incentivised tasks.

Monetary incentives generally have two kinds of effects, known as the standard direct price effect, and the indirect psychological effect. Standard direct price effect makes incentivised behavior more attractive; and the indirect psychological effect makes incentivised behavior less appealing, due to incentives containing information relayed from the principal (manager) to the agent (worker), which can provoke unexpected behavioural outcomes.

Agents receive information from both the size and existence of incentives. For example, offering members of the community high monetary compensation to be in the presence of a nuclear waste site, indicates that there are high risks involved with the plant, making community members less willing to accept the plant even in the presence of monetary incentives. Contrarily, in an experiment, a childcare introduced a fee of $3 for parents who picked their children up late. The information conveyed to the parents from this incentive was that the small fine indicated being late is not too bad, and in the short run the number of late pick-ups increased. This information persisted when the fee was removed, and parents who had experienced the fine were more likely to pick their child up late than those who had not received the information given by the incentive.

As a general rule however, where incentives are high enough, the standard direct price effect tends to take precedence over the indirect psychological effect, unless incentives are so high that agents form a negative inference of the circumstances.

Pay disparity 

Where workers are paid at a substantially lower rate to their peers, outputs and attendance can fall out of alignment with organisational objectives. Pay disparity can cause harm to an organisations social culture, cohesion and cooperation, and alter the workplace dynamic significantly. In developing countries where social interactions are heavily relied upon for economic activity, these effects are particularly undesirable. It has been proven that these consequences can be avoided by clearly justifying pay inequality to workers. Potentially due to self-serving bias, workers are unwilling to believe that they perform at a lower standard than their peers unless shown undeniable evidence. Particularly in settings where employees do not trust their managers, workers may be inclined to suspect favouritism until they are given evidence and justifications.

Tournament theory is used to describe why different pay levels exist between different roles in the business hierarchy. The idea of tournament theory is that agents who put in effort to achieve promotions are rewarded with a higher, non-incremental, pay rate. The reward of a higher pay rate incentivizes behavior that leads to promotions. This behavior is often lucrative and therefore ideal for the business. Tournaments can be very powerful at incentivizing performance. Empirical research in economics and managements have shown that tournament-like incentive structure increases the individual performance or workers and managers in the workplace.

Demand Analysis and Forecasting 

Demand forecasting assists management in predicting future sales, which informs operations decisions, marketing decisions, and allows revenue projection to occur, which assists the firm in future financial planning. The process of demand forecasting often uses business analytics, particularly predictive analytics, with respect to historical data and other analytical information to make an accurate estimation. For example, using an estimate of a firm's capital expenditure and cash flow, managers can create forecasts which assist in financial planning and improve the financial health of the firm.

Effective demand management considers factors which are both within and without the firms control, such as disposable income, competition, price, advertising and customer service.

Consumer choice is highly influential on demand analysis, as each consumer aims to maximise their satisfaction with a combination of goods and services, subject to the limitation of funds available.

Costs of production 

Production costs directly affects a firm's profitability. Managerial economics involves identifying the out put level for a firm, with respect to minimizing the production cost, where marginal cost equals marginal revenue, in order to maximize its profit. Most common types of costs:
Fixed costs
Sunk costs
Variable costs
Marginal cost
Short-run cost
Long-run cost

Profitability Management 

Profitability management is understanding what makes a firm profitable, and what can be done to improve its profitability. It integrates finance and sales, and aims to optimize sales revenue and marginal cost of the firm. Profit management is technology enabled, as firms must be quick to respond to rapid changing market and to know the true economic cost of its products and services. Management needs to drive cooperation between different functions of the firm such as sales, marketing, and finance, to ensure the teams recognize the importance of coordinated effort. Proper planning and profitability management is key to good business management.

Capital Management 

Capital management is the planning, monitoring, and controlling of the assets and liabilities of a firm, particularly, in an effort to maintain cash flow to meet the firm's short-term and long-term financial obligations. Proper capital management is important to the financial health of a firm, with efficient resource allocation through capital management, firms can improve its cash flow and profitability. Capital management involves tracking various ratios within the firm, most important ones include:

Capital ratio
Inventory turnover ratio
Collection ratio

Rate of return and cost of capital (i.e. interest rate) are important factors of capital management.

Implications of macroeconomics and microeconomics

When making decisions, managerial economics is used to analyze the micro and macroeconomic environments relating to an organization. Microeconomics considers the actions of individual firms surrounding utility maximization, whereas in comparison, Macroeconomics considers the actions and behaviour of the economy as a whole. As such, both area of economics have influence in the development of managerial economics frameworks.

Macroeconomics 
With regard to macroeconomic trends, the forecasting and analysis of areas such as output, unemployment, inflation and societal issues are essential in managerial economics. This is because these areas in the macroeconomy have the ability to provide an overview of global market conditions, which can be imperative for managers to understand. 
An example of managerial economics using macroeconomic principles is a manager choosing to hire new staff rather than training old ones in a time where the rate of unemployment is high, as the possible talent pool would be very large. The political structure of a country (whether authoritarian or democratic), political stability and attitudes towards the private sector can also affect the growth and development of organizations. This can be seen through the influence different government policies can have on management quality. In particular, policies around product market competition has been seen to significantly impact collective management practices in countries by either reducing or supporting poorly managed firms. A clear understanding of relevant markets and their different conditions is a vital task for a managerial economist, as even with market instability and fluctuations the goal is to always steer the company to profits.

Microeconomics 

Microeconomics is closely related to Managerial economics through areas such as; consumer demand and supply, opportunity cost, revenue creation and cost minimization. Managerial economics inculcates the application of microeconomics application and makes use of economic theories and methods in analyzing a business and its management. Moreover, managerial economics combines economic tool and technique to solve the managerial problems.

Microeconomics also gives indication on the most effective allocation of resources the business has available to it.
These microeconomic theories and considerations are used via managerial economics to make decisions regarding the business. By understanding the principles of microeconomics, managers can be well informed to make accurate decisions regarding the form.

An example of managerial economics using microeconomic principles is the decision of a manager to increase the price of the goods being sold. A manager should evaluate the price elasticity of the product to equate the respective demand of the product after the price change.

Managerial economics in practice

From a management perspective, managerial economics techniques are useful in many areas regarding business decision-making, most commonly including:

 Risk analysis – various models are used to quantify risk and asymmetric information and to employ them in decision rules to manage risk.
 Production analysis – microeconomic techniques are used to analyze production efficiency, optimum factor allocation, costs, economies of scale and to estimate the firm's cost function.
 Pricing analysis – microeconomic techniques are used to analyze various pricing decisions including transfer pricing, joint product pricing, price discrimination, price elasticity estimations, and choosing the optimum pricing method.
 Capital budgeting – investment theory is used to examine a firm's capital purchasing decisions.

At its core managerial economics is a decision-making process, by taking two or more options and optimizing a business decision while considering fixed resources to the function.

See also

Journals 
 Computational Economics. Aims and scope.
 Journal of Economics & Management Strategy.  Aims and scope.
 Managerial and Decision Economics

References
 Mankiw. (2021). Macroeconomics (11th ed.). Worth Publishers, Incorporated.

Further reading 
 Alan Hughes (1987). "managerial capitalism," The New Palgrave: A Dictionary of Economics, v. 3, pp. 293–96.
 Edward Lazear (2008). "personnel economics," The New Palgrave Dictionary of Economics. 2nd Edition. Abstract.
 Keith Weigelt (2006). Managerial Economics
 Elmer G. Wiens  The Public Firm with Managerial Incentives
 Khan Ahsan (2014). "Managerial Economics and Economic Analysis", 3rd edition, Pakistan.
arya sri."managerial economics " :MEFA . (2015).

External links
 https://web.archive.org/web/20111112021324/http://www.edushareonline.in/Management/eco%20new.pdf
 http://www.swlearning.com/economics/hirschey/managerial_econ/chap01.pdf

Management
Business economics